This is a list of Aldershot seasons in English football, from 1926—when the club was formed as Aldershot Town—to the 1953–54 season.

Seasons

Key 

P = Played
W = Games won
D = Games drawn
L = Games lost
F = Goals for
A = Goals against
Pts = Points
Pos = Final position

2Q = 2nd Qualifying Round
R1 = Round One
R2 = Round Two
R3 = Round Three
R5 = Round Five
W = Winner

Division shown in bold when it changes due to promotion or relegation.
Top scorer shown in bold when he set or equalled a club record.

Footnotes 

A.  League goals only.

References 

Seasons
 
Aldershot